One angry Man may refer to:

One Angry Man (film), a 2010 film starring Jackie Mason and directed by Peter LeDonne and Steven Moskovic
"One Angry Man", episode 24 in Series 5 of Judge John Deed
"One Angry Man – TRIAL", episode 10 in Ghost in the Shell: S.A.C. 2nd GIG